Morgan Carrington "Cary" Fowler Jr. (born 1949) is an American agriculturalist and the former executive director of the Crop Trust, currently serving as a senior advisor to the trust.  On May 5th, Dr. Fowler joined the U.S. Department of State as U.S. Special Envoy for Global Food Security.

Background
Fowler was born in 1949 to Morgan, a General Sessions judge, and Betty, a dietician. He graduated from White Station High School in Memphis, Tennessee, in 1967, and attended Rhodes College in Memphis, but transferred in his junior year to Simon Fraser University in Canada, earning his B.A. Honors degree in 1971. He received a Ph.D. degree in Sociology from Uppsala University in Sweden.

Fowler was active in civil rights demonstrations in Memphis. He was present at the Mason Temple on April 3, 1968, when Martin Luther King Jr. made his last speech, "I've Been to the Mountaintop". During the Vietnam War, he obtained conscientious objector status and worked at a hospital in North Carolina.

Career
In the 1970s-80s Fowler was Program Director for the National Sharecroppers Fund/Rural Advancement Fund. Following this, he served as Professor and Director of Research in the Department for International Environment & Development Studies at the Norwegian University of Life Sciences in Ås, Norway. He also led the International Conference and Programme on Plant Genetic Resources at the Food and Agriculture Organization of the United Nations (UN) in the 1990s. There, he produced the UN's first global assessment of the state of the world's crop diversity and was the chief author of the Food and Agriculture Organization's Global Plan of Action for Plant Genetic Resources. He subsequently supervised the negotiations that led to its adoption by 150 countries in 1996.

From 1996 to 2001, Fowler represented the Consultative Group on International Agricultural Research (CGIAR) in negotiations for the International Treaty on Plant Genetic Resources.

In 2010, he played a lead role in saving one of the world's largest living collections of fruit and berry varieties at the Pavlovsk Experiment Station in Russia. In order to save the Station, he led an international campaign of scientists and citizens who voiced their concerns about the threatened conversion of this station to a housing development.

In 2013, Fowler was elected to Membership in the Russian Academy of Sciences, which carries the title of Academician. He is one of two foreign members of the Academy.

Fowler has also previously served as a Special Assistant to the Secretary General of the World Food Summit, as a board member of the International Maize and Wheat Improvement Center (CIMMYT) in Mexico, as the chair of the board of The Livestock Conservancy, as a member of the Seed Savers Exchange board, and as a member of the National Plant Genetic Resources Board of the U.S. Fowler is also a member of the New York Botanical Garden Corporation.

On June 1, 2015, United States President Barack Obama announced his intent to appoint Fowler as a Member of the Board for International Food and Agricultural Development.

In April 2017, Fowler was elected Chair of the Board of Trustees of Rhodes College.

After being appointed by U.S. President Joe Biden, Fowler officially join the Office of Global Food Security at the U.S. Department of State on May 5, 2022.

Global Crop Diversity Trust

Fowler served as the Executive Director of the Global Crop Diversity Trust from 2005 to 2012. The trust's mandate is to ensure "the conservation and availability of crop diversity for food security worldwide." Fowler was influential in the creation of the Svalbard Global Seed Vault, which currently houses samples of more than one million distinct crop varieties.

Working with partner genebanks in 71 countries during Fowler's tenure as executive director, the Trust helped rescue 83,393 unique crop varieties from extinction.

It sponsored more than 40 projects to screen crop collections for important traits such as heat and drought tolerance. In partnership with the USDA, a state-of-the-art genebank management system ("GRIN-Global") was developed and made available to 38 genebanks internationally, and the first ever global portal to accession (sample) level information (Genesys) was launched. The Trust's endowment grew more than $100 million to $134 million, and total funds raised surpassed $200 million.

By the end of Fowler's tenure, the Trust concluded three major agreements intended to protect and conserve crop diversity: with the Millennium Seed Bank of Kew Gardens, the indigenous communities in the Andes, and the international genebanks of the Consultive Group on International Agricultural Research (CGIAR).

He stepped down as Executive Director of the trust in late 2012 but continues to serve in an advisory role and chairs the International Advisory Council of the Svalbard Global Seed Vault.

Awards and honors
Fowler has received several honorary degrees, including an Honorary Doctorate of Law degree from Simon Fraser University, an Honorary Doctorate of Science degree from Rhodes College, and an Honorary Doctorate of Humanities degree from Oberlin College. He received the Right Livelihood Award with Pat Mooney in 1985 for his work in agriculture and the preservation of biodiversity. Fowler has also received the Vavilov Medal from the Russian Academy of Agricultural Sciences. In 2010, he was one of ten recipients of the 16th Annual Heinz Awards with a special focus on global change. In 2012, he was awarded the "Wind Beneath my Wings" award jointly with his wife Amy P. Goldman at Bette Midler's annual "Hulaween" party. He was the baccalaureate speaker at the 2013 Rhodes College commencement ceremonies and received the 2015 William L. Brown Award for Excellence in Genetic Resource Conservation from the Missouri Botanical Garden.

In 2016 Fowler received the Frank N. Meyer Medal for Plant Genetic Resources, given by the Crop Science Society of America. He and his wife Amy Goldman Fowler jointly received the "Visionary" Award from the American Visionary Art Museum.

Fowler's book Seeds on Ice: Svalbard and the Global Seed Vault was awarded the 2016 Nautilus Book Award Gold Medal for best book in the Ecology/Environment category.

Fowler received the 2018 Thomas Jefferson Medal in Citizen Leadership, awarded jointly by the University of Virginia and the Thomas Jefferson Foundation, and gave the keynote address at Monticello on the occasion of Jefferson's 275th birthday.

Media
Fowler has made many media appearances, including the CBS news show 60 Minutes. He has been profiled in The New Yorker magazine, presented at the Pop!Tech conference and spoken at the TED Global Conference in Oxford.

Fowler was the focus of the 2013 documentary Seeds of Time, directed by director Sandy McLeod. The film centers on Fowler's work to protect the world's food supply with the Svalbard Global Seed Vault and the challenges facing seed protection and genetic diversity efforts as a result of climate change. It was produced by J. D. Marlow, Emily Triantaphyllis, and Chiemi Karasawa. Seeds of Time won the Audience Award at the San Francisco Green Film Festival 2014, Best Film at the Portland EcoFilm Festival 2014, and Best Cinematography at the Costa Rica Film Festival (Internacional de Cine) 2014. It was an official selection at South by Southwest 2014 and the Full Frame Documentary Film Festival 2014, and has been screened more than 90 times.

Personal life
In 2012, Fowler married author, gardener, and seed saving advocate Amy P. Goldman. He has two children and is a melanoma and testicular cancer survivor.

Bibliography
In addition to authoring more than 100 articles in various agriculture, law development and biology journals, Fowler has authored and coauthored several books.

References

External links
 Global Crop Diversity Trust
 Speech given at Pop!Tech, 2007
 Speech given at The Do Lectures, 2008
 
 "One seed at a time, protecting the future of food" (TEDGlobal 2009)

American agronomists
American conservationists
20th-century American botanists
21st-century American botanists
Foreign Members of the Russian Academy of Sciences
Uppsala University alumni
People from Memphis, Tennessee
Scientists from Tennessee
1949 births
Living people
Sol Goldman family